Aisquith Farm E Archeological Site is an archaeological site near Riva in Anne Arundel County, Maryland. It is one of several small sites located within the confines of Aisquith farm. It is associated with the Early and Middle Woodland periods of cultural development in Anne Arundel County. The site is significant as a base camp property type.

It was listed on the National Register of Historic Places in 1991.

References

External links
, including photo from 1990, at Maryland Historical Trust

Archaeological sites on the National Register of Historic Places in Maryland
Archaeological sites in Anne Arundel County, Maryland
Native American history of Maryland
Early Woodland period
Middle Woodland period
National Register of Historic Places in Anne Arundel County, Maryland